Aydos Hill is a hill in the north of Kartal district of Istanbul, Turkey. The hill is surrounded by woods.

Toponymy of Aydos
Aydos' name comes from Aydos Fortress, which was situated next to the hill. The fortress was built in the first half of 6th century by the Roman Empire. Today, the ruins of Aydos Fortress are in the Sultanbeyli and Pendik district of Istanbul.

Landforms of Istanbul Province
Hills of Turkey
Kartal